The ninety-three game pieces of the Lewis chessmen hoard were found on the Isle of Lewis in the Outer Hebrides of Scotland. Medieval in origin, they were first exhibited in Edinburgh in 1831 but it is unclear how much earlier they had been discovered. The hoard comprised seventy-eight distinctive chess pieces and fifteen other non-chess pieces, nearly all carved from walrus tusk ivory, and they are now displayed at the British Museum in London and National Museums Scotland in Edinburgh. Another chess piece, which turned up in 1964 and in 2019 was attributed to have come from the original hoard, now belongs to an undisclosed owner.

The style of carving, particularly that on the thrones of the seated figures, suggests they are Scandinavian in origin, most likely from Trondheim, the medieval capital of Norway until 1217.

The types of piece are similar to those in modern chess – the chessmen are the earliest found that have figures in clerical dress (bishops). The rooks are represented as warriors which came to be called "warders" at an early stage after they were discovered. Four of the warders are shown biting their shields – these have been identified as the berserkers of the Norse sagas. Christian and pagan influences are both present in the designs.

Provenance of hoard

The hoard of ninety-three games pieces was found on the Isle of Lewis and was exhibited in Edinburgh in 1831. Most accounts have said the pieces were found at Uig Bay on the west coast of Lewis but Caldwell et al. of National Museums Scotland (NMS) consider that Mealista, also in the parish of Uig and some  further south down the coast, is a more likely place for the hoard to have been discovered. The hoard was divided and sold in the 19th century – the British Museum (BM) holds eighty-two pieces and National Museums Scotland has the other eleven pieces.

At the British Museum it was Sir Frederic Madden, Assistant Keeper of Manuscripts, who persuaded the Trustees to purchase for 80 guineas (£84) the eighty-two pieces which he had been misled into believing was the entire hoard. Madden was a palaeographer, a scholar of early vernacular literature, but he was especially intrigued by these artifacts because he was a chess enthusiast. Madden immediately set about writing a monumental research paper about the collection,  – one that remains  informative and impressive today. At both museums the chessmen are an extremely popular exhibit for visitors.

A chess piece was purchased in Edinburgh in 1964 but it was not recognised at the time for what it was – it is now thought to have been made by the same people who made the pieces in the hoard and it was probably originally part the hoard itself. This piece was sold at auction in 2019 for £735,000. In 2023, the warder piece was displayed in a special exhibit at the Neue Galerie New York, as part of a special exhibit on the private collection of gallery founder and investor Ronald Lauder.

Attributes of types of piece

There are 79 chess pieces, including a warder that emerged in June 2019. 

Of the chess pieces, 60 are major pieces and 19 are pawns. In addition to the carved chess pieces, the hoard includes 14 plain ivory discs, as well as a single ivory buckle, which might have been part of a bag holding the pieces. Most pieces are carved from walrus tusk ivory, while at least three are made from whale tooth. None of the pieces have any sign of colouring, even under detailed scrutiny, though in 1832 several pieces were reportedly coloured red.

The major pieces all have attributes indicating their role in gameplay. Kings and queens are seated on thrones. The kings have long braided hair (except one) and hold in their right hand a sheathed sword resting across their knees. They wear a long mantle fastened at the right shoulder over various other types of clothing, and their crown has four trefoils. Queens are all cupping their chin in their right hand. Their long hair in braids is covered with a veil and their crown is either like the kings' or has a continuous pierced band. Covering their gown, the queens have a long mantle or cloak leaving a gap at the front.

The bishops are most variable in design – some are standing and others are seated and they are dressed in one of two types of liturgical vestments: five wear a cope over a tunicle, and the others wear pontifical vestments: a chasuble and stole over a dalmatic, over an alb. They are all clean-shaven, wear a mitre over their cropped shoulder-length hair, and are holding a crozier with one or both hands. Some bishops are holding a book or are giving a blessing.

The knights have beards and moustaches and are mounted on rather small horses equipped with stirrups and bridles. They are wearing long gambesons with belts and are carrying spears and long, narrow kite-shaped shields. When they carry swords they are hung from a baldric over the shoulder.

The warders have long straight hair and they are all standing with drawn swords, variously shaped helmets, and shields – four warders are biting their shields. Most are wearing long gambesons but a few wear chain mail, usually incorporating a chain mail hood.

The pawns are not figurative in design and are either bullet-shaped or slab-like. Two have some engraved ornamentation. The discs are very plain with two or three inscribed circumferential circles.

List of pieces

Bishops, warders and berserkers

When chess was first developed in India, the piece that eventually became the bishop was the elephant and the rook was originally the chariot (called  rukh in Persian). Under Islamic influence the pieces later became abstract in design. When the game spread into medieval Europe the design of most pieces returned to being figurative once more.  The rook was an exception to this and thus the warrior rooks of the Lewis collection are unusual in this sense. The Lewis sets are the earliest to be found that include any sort of clerical figure, in this case bishops, although a few single pieces depicting bishops have been found that may be earlier.

In his 1832 research paper, Madden called the warriors "warders" to imply a status between that of foot soldier and knight – this name has stuck. Madden was the first person to understand that the pieces showing warriors biting their shields were representing berserkers – warriors who fought in a frenzied fury, possibly in a drug-induced trance. From his scholarship in paleography Madden knew that the Norse sagas tell that berserkers were known for biting their shields. For example, in about 1225, writing in emerging Christian times but looking back to pagan times, the poet historian Snorri Sturluson wrote

Carving on thrones

The kings, queens and seven of the bishops are seated on thrones with elaborately carved backs and sides. Deeply carved scrolls of foliage, sometimes including beasts, have frequently been used but on other pieces interlaced geometrical designs have been adopted. A horizontal or vertical bar may be used allowing more than one design to be displayed. The decorations on the thrones are often more boldly carved than on the figures themselves – the individual workman, freed from the need to produce a figure with specific attributes, could operate  outside any tight constraints of a pattern book. Two pawns and the buckle have similar designs in shallow engraving. The back of the king's throne (H.NS 19) is shown above and the main table includes links to images of the backs and sides of some of the other pieces.

Analysis
Most experts have been cautious in interpreting the meaning of the queens cupping their chins in their hands. However, James Robinson suggests their pose indicates sorrow – compassion for the troops who have fallen in battle.

The considerable overall similarity in design and carving technique, but with idiosyncratic differences between individual pieces, leads experts to think the sets were made by several people all working at the same place. In terms of number of pieces, the chessmen could be part of four chess sets, although they could be from more. If there were four sets then 49 pieces are missing – a knight, three warders and 45 pawns.

The pieces are dated by experts to have been made in the later stages of the twelfth century when Europe had a strong international culture stretching from Greenland to the Holy Land.  As clues to when they were made, the bishops' mitres have their peaks at the front and back – until about 1150 the custom was to have the peaks sideways. The shields of the knights and warders have no heraldic markings displaying heredity – scholars think this dates the pieces to before the start of the thirteenth century. Caldwell et al. think the differences between the bishops' mitres may reflect a change of style from mid-12th to early 13th century. The high peaks and arched headbands of two of the bishops' mitres may be from the 13th century. The warder recently found is the only piece to have had radiocarbon dating performed. Two independent analyses give 1283–1479 and 1328–1434 (95% confidence intervals) for the walrus ivory – further analysis is required to resolve the difference from the estimates made from the style of the work.

Carving of a similar style has been found at Trondheim in Norway so it is often put forward as the place of manufacture. It is only in Scandinavia that there was a tradition of berserkers – warriors who fought ferociously, possibly in a trance. 

Back in 1832 Madden had suggested an Icelandic origin, not only based on style but on his thought that only in Iceland was the piece called biskup and that elsewhere unrelated words were used for pieces with no clerical connections. However, it is now generally considered the pieces were probably made in Trondheim – a royal centre and the location of the archbishop's cathedral – or, less likely, Bergen.

In 2010 an Icelandic civil engineer and former politician argued that the pieces were carved in Iceland. Madeline Bunting writes that this "sparked an ill-tempered argument with Norwegian and British archaeologists". The historian Alex Woolf rejected the idea: "the pieces would have had to have been made where there were wealthy patrons to employ craftsmen and pay for the material. 'A hell of a lot of walrus ivory went into making those chessmen, and Iceland was a bit of a scrappy place full of farmers,' Dr. Woolf said."

For the pieces in the British Museum,  gives detailed descriptions and a few line drawings and  provides comprehensive descriptions and photographs, Dalton numbering them from 78 to 144 as is still current. 3D images of some of the pieces are available on a website supported by the British Museum and National Museums Scotland. 

Caldwell et al. divide the pieces into four hypothetical 32-piece chess sets, depending on the size of the pieces but it was not possible to determine the original colour of the pieces. Similarly, by studying the appearance of the figures' faces, they allocated 50 of the major pieces into five groups, indicating possibly different craftsmen: (A) straight nose with flat base; (B) bulbous nose; (C) narrow nose with upturned tip; (D) short, wide face; (E) flat profile nose with prominent nostrils.

The discs, which are all held by the British Museum, are considered to be game pieces, variously described as "draughts-pieces" or "tables-men" – tables was a predecessor board game to backgammon and draughts

See also

Clonard chess piece

Notes

References

Citations

Works cited

 
 
 
  – reprinted in 
 (McClain "Art and Evolution of Chess" 0:01:47–0:40:45, Robinson "Made for Laughs?" 0:41:22–1:19:20, Little "Playing Games in the Middle Ages" 1:19:30–2:10:11)

Further reading

 

Chess sets
Medieval chess
Chess in Norway
Chess in Scotland
Medieval European objects in the British Museum
Collections of the National Museums of Scotland
Scandinavian Scotland
12th century in Scotland
History of the Outer Hebrides
Isle of Lewis
Treasure troves in Scotland
Viking treasure troves
Romanesque art
Viking art
Ivory works of art
1831 archaeological discoveries
Scotland-related lists
12th century-related lists
12th-century artifacts